Three's Company is a 1958 comic opera by Antony Hopkins broadcast by the Australian Broadcasting Corporation in 1958.  It aired in Sydney on August 13, 1958.

See also
List of live television plays broadcast on Australian Broadcasting Corporation (1950s)

References

External links

Australian performances of Three's Company at Ausstage

Australian television plays
Australian television plays based on operas
1958 television plays
Australian Broadcasting Corporation original programming
English-language television shows
Australian live television shows
Black-and-white Australian television shows